Eidsvik is a village in Kvinnherad municipality in Vestland county, Norway.  The village is located on the northwestern end of the island of Halsnøya, just west of the village of Sæbøvik.  The village lies on a thin, narrow isthmus-like peninsula sticking out into the Hardangerfjorden.

Eid Church is located in this village, and the church serves the whole island of Halsnøy.  Eidsvik Skipsbyggeri, a ship building facility is also located in this village.  The village is most notable for being the site of the historic Halsnøy Abbey which are located in the western part of the village.

This makes it the second largest urban area on the island. The largest is Sæbøvik which is located just to the east.

References

Villages in Vestland
Kvinnherad